The canton of Beuvry is an administrative division of the Pas-de-Calais department, in northern France. It was created at the French canton reorganisation which came into effect in March 2015. Its seat is in Beuvry.

It consists of the following communes: 

Beuvry 
La Couture
Essars
Fleurbaix
Hinges
Laventie
Locon
Neuve-Chapelle
Richebourg
Sailly-sur-la-Lys
Verquigneul
Verquin
Vieille-Chapelle

References

Cantons of Pas-de-Calais